The Cosgrove Marcus Messer Athletic Center is a sports facility located in New Haven, Connecticut.  It is the home of the Albertus Magnus College Athletic Department and the school's basketball and volleyball team, the Falcons. It is also home to the Connecticut Topballerz of the American Basketball Association (ABA). The facility has a basketball/volleyball court, 25-yard pool, racquetball courts, and more.  The team's center court, or “The Nest” as it is affectionately named by the students of the school features seating for 600 spectators.

References

External links
 

Basketball venues in Connecticut
1989 establishments in Connecticut
Sports venues completed in 1989
College basketball venues in the United States